Crotalaria socotrana is a species of plant in the family Fabaceae. It is found only in Yemen. Its natural habitat is subtropical or tropical dry forests.

References

socotrana
Endemic flora of Socotra
Flora of Yemen
Vulnerable flora of Asia
Taxonomy articles created by Polbot
Taxa named by Isaac Bayley Balfour